Qaidabad (Punjabi), is a city and tehsil of Khushab District in the Punjab, Pakistan. It is located 283 kilometers away from Islamabad and 295 kilometers from Lahore in North West Punjab. It is located on main Lahore Mianwali road, 90 kilometers from Sargodha and 40 kilometers from Khushab. It is founded by Sardar Abdul Rab Nishter in 1951 named after Quaid e Azam (The Founder of Pakistan).

It has famous Warcha Salt Mine. It has road links to sandy agricultural area of Thal and with the Mountain of Soon Valley. It is part of National Assembly constituency NA-94 and Provincial Assembly of Punjab constituency PP-82.

History
Most of Muslim rulers who attacked Indo-Pak from Afghanistan used this route to access Delhi. Famous Gernalee Road also passes from this city. Before partition, this area was under British rule. During British rule, Khushab was a tehsil of the old Shahpur District.
The predominantly Muslim population supported Muslim League and Quaid e Azam during Pakistan Movement.

Demography
Most of the population are farmers; about 85% of the population live in villages and only 15% live in the municipal urban area. But the trend is shifting and people are moving to the urban area.

Economy
Agriculture is important to the local economy, particularly the growing of Rice, wheat, Black gram which is exported all over Pakistan and around the world. The grain market of Quaidabad is one of the famous grain markets in Punjab particularly for Rice trading. Overseas people also contribute much in the economy especially the people of Goleywali.

Industry
Before 90s Quaid Abad was famous due to Quaidabad carpets - Quaid Abad woolen mill which is now just a plan land after privatization. Currently Industry of Quaid Abad is primarily an Agro-based. The main industries include Rice Mills, Poultry Sheds and Salt processing Units.

Climate
The climate of Quaid Abad is extreme, reaching 50 °C in summer, and down to 0 °C in winter. The soil of the suburbs is fertile which is irrigated by Mahajir Branch.this land is a part of citrus land so citrus fruit like malta is successful here.  But this tehsil has unique surface of having dry mountains on one side and sandy soil on other corner.

Famous Places'
Famous places to see here is warcha salt mine located at Rukhla mandi. Beautiful Soon Sakeser valley is very near to it . "Amb Shareef" is also a famous place of Quaidabad Tehsil

Sports
Major sports : Cricket and Volley Ball

Others : Football, Hockey, Badminton

Administration
Quaid Abad Tehsil is subdivided into 12 Union Councils.

BANDIAL
Bijar
Chak No.14/Mb
Goleywali
Gunjial Janubi
Okhali Mohlah
Quaidabad
Utra Janubi
Warcha
Gunjial Shumali
Choaa
Panja

Colleges & Universities

Quaid Abad houses few Government colleges. These include:

Colleges:

Govt. Degree College for Boys,                           Govt. Degree College for Women,                      Punjab College for boys & girls,                            Superior group for boys & girls                                             Al-Hira College of Technology                                The Reader group of colleges     

Famous Schools :

Dar-e-Arqam High School,     The Scholars High School,      The Arqam high School,    Allied high School,                         

..
Al Syed High School Quiadabad, Al-Noor Al-Noor Public School and Shaheer Web & IT Center.

Union councils of Khushab District
Populated places in Khushab District
Khushab District